Kenzero is a computer trojan that is spread across peer-to-peer networks and is programmed to monitor the browsing history of victims.

History
The Kenzero trojan was first discovered on the November 27, 2009, but researchers think it went undetected for a few months prior to the initial discovery.

Operations
Kenzero attacks computers that download files through peer-to-peer networks (P2P). Once the file is opened, the virus locates the victim's browsing history and publishes it online. People can then view the file(s).

References

Windows trojans
Hacking in the 2010s